Timmiarmiit (old spelling 'Tingmiarmit') is an uninhabited island of the King Frederick VI Coast, Sermersooq municipality, southern Greenland.

Geography
The island is located at the entrance of the Timmiarmiut Fjord in a very indented area of King Frederick VI Coast in southeastern Greenland. Timmiarmiit's coastline is very irregular with a deep fjord on its eastern side that almost divides the island in two. It has an area of 229.3 km ² and a shoreline of 140.6 kilometres. It is separated from the mainland in the north by the Timmiarmiit Tunorqútariât, a narrow sound. Off its southern shoreline lie the islands of Aaluik and Ingmikârtajivit, as well as a multitude of islets and rocks. 

The Qivítip Igtiva and Inukasingmit Paleo-Eskimo archaeological sites are located on the SW of the island —the latter on an islet off the shore— and the Sarpap Tupertivâ site on the NW headland. All former Inuit settlements on Timmiarmiit are on shoreline locations.

See also
List of islands of Greenland

References

External links
Mesoproterozoic dykes in the Timmiarmiit area, Southeast Greenland: evidence for a continuous Gardar dyke swarm across Greenland’s North Atlantic Craton
Uninhabited islands of Greenland

it:Timmiarmiut